Gamma Apodis (γ Aps, γ Apodis) is the Bayer designation for a star in the southern circumpolar constellation of Apus. It is visible to the naked eye with an apparent visual magnitude of 3.86. A stellar classification of G9 III identifies it as a giant star in the later stages of its evolution.

Naming

References

147675
Apodis, Gamma
Apus (constellation)
G-type giants
Astronomical X-ray sources
081065
6102
Durchmusterung objects
Gliese and GJ objects